Mesophleps chloranthes is a moth of the family Gelechiidae. It is found in Australia (New South Wales, Western Australia).

References

Moths described in 1900
Mesophleps